Futera is a trading card publisher founded in 1989. It is a privately owned company, its main markets being Asia, Europe, Australasia, US, with commercial and operational bases located in SE Asia, print and distribution facilities in UK/Europe and Asia-wide, and its headquarters in Dubai.

Futera has been producing several collections covering different topics, sports cards include association football, auto racing (F1), baseball, basketball, boxing, cricket, cycle sport (Tour de France), horse racing, rugby, and surfing.

Non-sports cards by Futera include TV & film entertainment series.

Licenses
Futera was established in 1989 and during its 30-year history has been the Official Trading Card Licensee for many football clubs around Europe including FC Barcelona, PSG, Liverpool, Arsenal and more.

Futera has also been the Official Trading Card Licensee for other sports spanning Formula 1, The Australian Cricket Board (Cricket Australia), World Cup Cricket, Australian National Basketball League (NBL), Australian Soccer, Australian Rugby Football Union, Australian Baseball Association, New Zealand Cricket Board, New Zealand Rugby League and  Rugby Football Union, Tour de France, Horseracing, World Surfing Federation, and Scandinavian Handball.

Futera's licences extended to stickers, phonecards and confectionery with some Clubs and in 2000 Futera created a licensed Confectionery line called 'Total Football' combining Futera's football cards from 10 English Premier League and Championship Football Clubs with Chupa Chups lollipops.

Futera's non-Sport Licences have included Mattel's "Barbie", BBC Television Sci-fi Series "Red Dwarf" in association with Grant Naylor Film Productions, and the feature film "Chicken Run" with Universal Studios, Aardman Animations & Pathé.

Futera Cards

Futera have produced many different types of cards since their inception in 1989 including Memorabilia and Autograph cards as well as 24ct gold plated framed cards.

In 2021, a Futera Lewis Hamilton Futera card sold for $312,000 in a Goldin auction.

Other Futera activities 

Futera launched their own football club named Futera United in 2021 allowing fans to help to manage the team via the blockchain and NFTs.

References

External links 
 

Trading cards